
Year 39 BC was either a common year starting on Friday, Saturday or Sunday or a leap year starting on Saturday (link will display the full calendar) of the Julian calendar (the sources differ, see leap year error for further information) and a common year starting on Saturday of the Proleptic Julian calendar. At the time, it was known as the Year of the Consulship of Censorinus and Sabinus (or, less frequently, year 715 Ab urbe condita). The denomination 39 BC for this year has been used since the early medieval period, when the Anno Domini calendar era became the prevalent method in Europe for naming years.

Events

By place

Roman Republic 
 Marcus Antonius dispatches Publius Ventidius Bassus with 11 legions to the East and drives Quintus Labienus out of Asia Minor. Labienus retreats into Syria, where he receives Parthian reinforcements. Ventidius finally defeats him in the battle at the Taurus Mountains.
 Publius Ventidius defeats Pharnastanes with his cataphracts at the Amanus Gates, and goes on to reclaim Syria, Phoenicia and Judea. Labienus flees to Cilicia, where he is captured and executed.
 Sextus Pompey, styles himself "son of Neptune", controls Sicily, Sardinia, Corsica and the Peloponnesus, and is recognized by the Triumvirate in the Pact of Misenum. The pact helps to assure Rome's grain supply, and the blockade on Roman Italy is lifted.

Births 
 Antonia the Elder, daughter of Mark Antony, grandmother of Nero and Messalina (d. bef. AD 25)
 Julia the Elder, daughter of Caesar Augustus (d. AD 14)

Deaths 
 Quintus Labienus, Roman general (murdered)

References